Introspection is the second full-length album by the band Myriads.

Track listing
 "Enigmatic Colours of the Night" - 9:32 
 "Miserere Mei" - 11:45
 "Inside" - 5:55
 "The Sanctum of My Soul" - 6:15
 "Portal to the Mind" - 14:57 
 "Falling in the Equinox" - 3:57
 "Flickering Thoughts" - 7:55 
 "Encapsulated" - 9:12
 "The Ascent" - 4:37

External links
Introspection @ Encyclopaedia Metallum

2002 albums
Myriads albums
Napalm Records albums